Cameron Smith (born 18 August 1993) is an Australian professional golfer who currently plays on the LIV Golf League. He won the 2022 Open Championship, and has won five other tournaments on the PGA Tour, including the 2022 Players Championship.

Early life
As a two-year-old, Smith began playing at Wantima Country Club, a small golf course in the northern suburb of Brisbane. While his father Des worked as a printer and was a club captain at the club. Smith's mother, Sharon, worked at the local department store. Smith has a sister, Mel.

Professional career
Smith turned professional in 2013 and played on the PGA Tour of Australasia. He was tied for second at the 2015 Coca-Cola Queensland PGA Championship and at the 2016 Emirates Australian Open.

2014
Smith played on the Asian Tour in 2014, finishing in the top-10 seven times and finishing 5th on the Order of Merit. His best finish was tied for second at the 2014 CIMB Niaga Indonesian Masters. Smith's first PGA Tour event was the CIMB Classic in October 2014, which was a co-sanctioned event with the Asian Tour; he tied for 5th.

2015
In April, Smith tied for 15th in the RBC Heritage, playing on a sponsor's exemption. After qualifying for the 2015 U.S. Open, his top-4 finish earned him an invitation to the 2016 Masters Tournament. The finish also earned Smith Special Temporary Membership on the PGA Tour for the remainder of the 2015 season. Smith earned his 2015–16 PGA Tour card by earning enough as a non-member to have been in the top 125 on the money list: his best three events would have been sufficient.

2016
In 2016 Smith finished 157th in the FedEx points list. His performance in the Web.com Tour Finals, where he was runner-up in the Nationwide Children's Hospital Championship, allowed him to return to the PGA Tour for 2017.

2017
In May, Smith, partnered with Jonas Blixt, won the Zurich Classic of New Orleans, the first team event on the PGA Tour since 1981. The pair did not make a bogey during the tournament and defeated Scott Brown and Kevin Kisner in a playoff. It was Smith's first career PGA Tour win. He had two top-10 finishes on the 2017 PGA Tour, tying for 6th place at the Valero Texas Open and for 7th at the Wyndham Championship and finished 46th in the FedEx Cup standings. He started the new PGA Tour season by tying for 5th place in the CIMB Classic in Malaysia and finishing 3rd in the CJ Cup in South Korea in late 2017. Smith continued his good form by finishing 4th in the Emirates Australian Open and then winning the Australian PGA Championship the following week, beating Jordan Zunic in a playoff.

2018
In December, Smith defended his title at the Australian PGA Championship, winning by two strokes over Marc Leishman.

2019
In December, Smith played on the International team at the 2019 Presidents Cup at Royal Melbourne Golf Club in Australia. The U.S. team won 16–14. Smith went 1–1–1 including a win in his Sunday singles match against Justin Thomas.

2020
In January, Smith won the Sony Open in Hawaii in a playoff over Brendan Steele; his first individual victory on the PGA Tour.

In finishing tied for runner-up to Dustin Johnson at the 2020 Masters in November, Smith became the first golfer in Masters history to shoot four rounds in the 60s (67-68-69-69).

2021
In April, Smith won the Zurich Classic of New Orleans for the second time. This time he was partnered with fellow countryman Marc Leishman. The duo won in a playoff over Louis Oosthuizen and Charl Schwartzel.

Smith qualified for the Tokyo 2020 Olympics and competed in the men's competition in July/August 2021. He scored −14 across the four rounds and finished tenth. In spite of shooting 66 in the third and fourth rounds, he was still out of medal contention.

2022: Players and Open Championship victories
In January, Smith won the 2022 Sentry Tournament of Champions at Kapalua Resort on Maui, Hawaii. Smith shot a PGA Tour record of 34 under par winning by one stroke over world number one Jon Rahm. 34 under par beat the previous mark of 31 under par set by Ernie Els at the same tournament in 2003. In March, Smith won The Players Championship at TPC Sawgrass, becoming the fifth Australian to win the tournament; having hit his second shot on the final hole into the water, Smith managed to get up and down to make a bogey and finish one stroke ahead of Anirban Lahiri.

In July, Smith won his first major championship at the 150th Open Championship, played at the Old Course at St Andrews. He shot a final-round 64 to come from four strokes off the lead and finish one shot ahead of Cameron Young and two ahead of joint third round leader Rory McIlroy. During the FedEx Cup Playoffs in August, he struggled with a hip injury, and did not play in the second event, the BMW Championship. At the end of the PGA Tour season, he won the PGA Player of the Year award. In November, Smith won the Fortinet Australian PGA Championship for the third time.

Joining LIV Golf
At the end of August, following the Tour Championship, it was announced that Smith had joined LIV Golf. The move had been speculated since The Open, with him repeatedly declining to confirm or deny the rumours.

Smith finished in a tie for 4th in his first LIV start in Boston, with Dustin Johnson winning the 3-man playoff. He won in his second start, scoring rounds of 66, 68 and 69 to finish on 13-under par to win by three shots ahead of previous winner Dustin Johnson and Peter Uihlein. Smith won over $5 million from his 4 starts on LIV Golf.

Amateur wins
2011 Australian Boys' Amateur, Australian Amateur Stroke Play, Victorian Junior Masters
2012 Australian Amateur medallist
2013 Australian Amateur

Professional wins (10)

PGA Tour wins (6)

PGA Tour playoff record (3–1)

European Tour wins (4)

1Co-sanctioned by the PGA Tour of Australasia

European Tour playoff record (1–0)

PGA Tour of Australasia wins (3)

1Co-sanctioned by the European Tour

PGA Tour of Australasia playoff record (1–1)

LIV Golf Invitational Series wins (1)

Major championships

Wins (1)

Results timeline
Results not in chronological order in 2020.

CUT = missed the half-way cut
"T" = tied
NT = No tournament due to COVID-19 pandemic

Summary

Most consecutive cuts made – 11 (2018 Open – 2021 PGA)
Longest streak of top-10s – 2 (2020 Masters – 2021 Masters)

The Players Championship

Wins (1)

Results timeline

CUT = missed the halfway cut
"T" indicates a tie for a place
C = Cancelled after the first round due to the COVID-19 pandemic

Results in World Golf Championships

1Cancelled due to COVID-19 pandemic

QF, R16, R32, R64 = Round in which player lost in match play
NT = No tournament
"T" = Tied

Team appearances
Amateur
Nomura Cup (representing Australia): 2011 (winners)
Eisenhower Trophy (representing Australia): 2012
Bonallack Trophy (representing Asia/Pacific): 2012
Sloan Morpeth Trophy (representing Australia): 2012
Australian Men's Interstate Teams Matches (representing Queensland): 2010 (winners), 2011 (winners), 2012, 2013 (winners)

Professional
World Cup (representing Australia): 2018
Presidents Cup (representing the International team): 2019

Recognition
2020 – Greg Norman Medal
2022 - Australian Institute of Sport Male Athlete of The Year

See also
2016 Web.com Tour Finals graduates

References

External links
Cameron Smith  at the PGA Tour of Australasia official site

Australian male golfers
PGA Tour golfers
PGA Tour of Australasia golfers
Asian Tour golfers
LIV Golf players
Winners of men's major golf championships
Olympic golfers of Australia
Golfers at the 2020 Summer Olympics
Korn Ferry Tour graduates
Golfers from Brisbane
Sportsmen from Queensland
1993 births
Living people